Ingrid Liepa (born 24 March 1966) is a Canadian speed skater. She competed at the 1994 Winter Olympics and the 1998 Winter Olympics.

References

External links
 

1966 births
Living people
Canadian female speed skaters
Olympic speed skaters of Canada
Speed skaters at the 1994 Winter Olympics
Speed skaters at the 1998 Winter Olympics
Sportspeople from Ottawa
20th-century Canadian women